Ali Shamil oglu Hasanov is an Azerbaijani politician who serves as the Deputy Prime Minister of Azerbaijan since 1998, former chairman of State Committee of Republic of Azerbaijan for Refugees and IDPs. He also chairs the State Committee for International Humanitarian Aid.

Political career
Hasanov supervised provision of newly built housing for Azerbaijani refugees and IDPs and often travels to regions of Azerbaijan where the refugees had been settled after the First Nagorno-Karabakh War. The scope of activity of the State Committee of Republic of Azerbaijan for Refugees and IDPs was enhanced by the former President of Azerbaijan Heydar Aliyev in September 1998 with the purpose of bettering the social conditions of the refugees and Ali Hasanov was appointed the chairman of the committee.

As the chairman of the committee, Hasanov supervised large amounts of funding spent by the government and international organizations for needs of refugees. According to the chairman, $1.3 billion from the state budget, $850 million from the State Oil Fund of Azerbaijan and $738 million from international organizations was allocated in 2008.

See also
Cabinet of Azerbaijan
Politics of Azerbaijan

References

People from Jabrayil District
Living people
Azerbaijan Communist Party (1920) politicians
Government ministers of Azerbaijan
Political office-holders in Azerbaijan
1948 births